The IV Corps, or the Gajraj Corps, is a military field formation of the Indian Army, covering the states of Assam and western Arunachal Pradesh.

History
IV Corps under Lieutenant General NMS Irwin was deployed from the Middle East in January 1942 for the defense of Assam from the advancing Japanese during World War II. Following the end of the war, the corps was demobilised in November 1945.

The corps was re-raised by Lieutenant General Brij Mohan Kaul at Tezpur, Assam on 4 October 1962, close to the Sino-Indian War. Over the years, it has played a role in both conventional and counter-insurgency operations in the eastern theatre, especially during the 1971 war in Bangladesh.

During the Indo-Pakistani War of 1971, the Gajraj Corps made the famous advance to Dhaka during the liberation of Bangladesh and also participated in the Meghna Heli Bridge Operations. Lieutenant General Sagat Singh, PVSM had innovatively employed Mi-4 helicopters to cross Meghna River, which was considered impassable and his Corps relentlessly attacked and defeated the Pakistani forces. The innovative use of helicopters has remained unparalleled. The Corps had proved its mettle and very proficiently carried out its task in the most complex sector in terms of distances from the logistic bases.

The corps has been active in counter-insurgency roles as part of Operation Bajrang (from November 1990), Operation Rhino I (from September 1991) and Operation Rhino II (from April 1992).

Composition
It currently consists of:

71 Mountain Division, headquartered at Missamari.
5th Mountain Division (Ball of Fire Division), headquartered at Rupa near Bomdila. The division was converted to a mountain division in 1963. It is posted to the west of 2 Mountain Division in Arunachal Pradesh.
21st Mountain Division (Red Horn Division), headquartered at Rangia. It includes 77 Mountain Brigade.

List of General Officers Commanding
For the list of GOCs between 1942 and 1945 - List of GOCs 1942-45

Notes

Notes

See also 
I Corps (India)
II Corps (India)
III Corps (India)

References
John H. Gill, An Atlas of the 1971 India - Pakistan War: The Creation of Bangladesh, Near East South Asia Centre for Strategic Studies (National Defense University), via scribd.com

External links 
Globalsecurity.org, Eastern Command, accessed July 2010

Tezpur
004
Corps of India in World War II
Corps of British India
Military units and formations established in 1961
1961 establishments in India